Unknown White Male may refer to:

 Unknown White Male (2005 film), a documentary film directed by Rupert Murray
 Unknown (2011 film) (working title: Unknown White Male), a drama thriller directed by Jaume Collet-Serra